Conor Nigel Benn (born 28 September 1996) is a British professional boxer who has held the WBA Continental welterweight title since 2018. He is the son of former two-division world champion of boxing, Nigel Benn.

As of May 2022, Benn is ranked as the world's eighth best active welterweight by ESPN, ninth by The Ring magazine, and tenth by the Transnational Boxing Rankings Board and BoxRec.

Early life
Benn had a privileged upbringing due to his father Nigel's successful boxing career. Twelve years of his childhood were spent on the Spanish island of Mallorca, where he lived with his family in a gated, eight-bedroom mansion with a pool, and had a Jacuzzi in his room. Despite this, his father taught him financial self-reliance by never giving him money; Benn said he supported himself by "doing painting and decorating in Spain for €20 a day...from six to five". He also spent time in Australia where he boxed as an amateur before starting his professional career.

Professional career

Early career 
Benn has been trained by Tony Sims since his professional debut, with his father, Nigel, having known and sparred with Tony since both of their respective boxing careers. He made his professional debut in April 2016 aged 19 at The O2 Arena in London defeating Bulgarian Ivailo Boyanov by technical knockout in the first round. He followed this with a points victory over Luke 'The Nuke' Keleher at The SSE Hydro in Glasgow in May, and a knockout of Lukas Radic in June On 10 September 2016, Benn was due to fight Silvije Kebet on the undercard of Gennady Golovkin vs. Kell Brook. After Silvije Kebet pulled out Benn defeated late replacement Joe Ducker by technical knockout in the second round to take his unbeaten record to 4–0. On 24 September, Benn fought his first ever six round fight and was taken the distance by Ross Jameson. Benn won a clear points decision. This also marked his first time fighting at the Manchester Arena, a venue his father fought at many times at world championship level. Benn was next due to fight at Wembley Arena in London on 26 November but pulled out four days earlier due to illness. On 1 December, it was announced that Benn would be part of the Anthony Joshua vs. Éric Molina heavyweight title undercard at the Manchester Arena on 10 December. His opponent was announced as Steven Backhouse. Benn scored two knockdowns in round 1 and won the fight via knockout. The first knockdown came just after the opening bell after a left hook. Blackhouse never recovered and the fight was stopped just over a minute into the round.

After a lay off, it was announced that Benn would return to the O2 Arena on 1 July 2017. Benn stopped Mike Cole after knocking him down following a left hook in round 3, recording his fifth stoppage victory. It was announced that Benn would appear on an edition of NXTGEN on Sky Sports on 1 September 2017 alongside Olympians Joshua Buatsi, Lawrence Okolie and Joe Cordina. Fighting at the York Hall for the first time in his career, Benn stopped previously unbeaten Kane Baker in round 2. It was said that Benn would next fight on Anthony Joshua's next world title defence on 28 October at the Principality Stadium in Cardiff. It was announced that Benn would return to the Manchester Arena on the undercard of Anthony Crolla vs. Ricky Burns on 7 October 2017. Benn remained undefeated knocking out Nathan Clarke in the first round. The fight lasted 2 minutes and 16 seconds. In the post fight, Benn spoke about how his improvement in the gym has helped him fight better in the ring. Promoter Eddie Hearn stated that Benn's next fight would be in the United States. Benn made his American debut on 11 November fighting Mexican boxer Brandon Sanudo at the Nassau Veterans Memorial Coliseum in Uniondale, New York. Benn scored his fifth consecutive knockout win, dropping Sanudo in round 2 with a left hook to the body. The fight was stopped by the referee after just 1 minute of round 2. Benn next fought at the York Hall in London on 13 December 2017 against French boxer Cedrick Peynaud. Benn was dropped twice in the opening round, which was also the first time he was knocked down as a professional. He beat the count both times and managed to drop Peynaud down in round 5 and 6. The fight went to the referee's scorecard, who had the fight 57–54 in favour of Benn, maintaining his unbeaten run.

In January 2018, the British Boxing Board of Control (BBBofC) set out some purse bids for their titles. One of the fights they ordered put Benn against Isaac MacLeod in an English welterweight title eliminator. They stated the fight must take place by June 2018. On 29 January 2018 it was announced that Benn would next fight on Amir Khan's UK return on 21 April at the Echo Arena in Liverpool, marking Benn's first fight in Merseyside. On 5 February, Benn signed a two-year extension with Matchroom. On the Khan-Lo Greco undercard, Benn defeated Chris Truman via round 4 TKO in the scheduled 6 round bout. Hearn later stated that Benn wanted to rematch Peynaud, likely for July 2018. 

On 13 June, it was announced that Benn would fight Cedric Peynaud in a rematch on the undercard of Dillian Whyte vs. Joseph Parker on 28 July at The O2 Arena in London. The WBA announced the fight would be contested for their vacant Continental welterweight title. Benn dropped Peynaud three times, boxing his way to a 10-round unanimous decision victory. The three judges' scored the bout 98–90, 98–91, 97–90 in his favour. Peynaud started the fight swinging aiming to land big shots, however Benn used his feet to move around the ring and sensibly box. Peynaud managed to land clean shots on Benn, without doing too much damage. The first knockdown came in round 2, although it was clear that Peynaud lost balance and slipped to the canvas. In round 7, Peynaud took a knee following a hard body shot. A right hook dropped Peynaud down a third time in round 9. Benn was able to go the 10 round distance for the first time in his professional career.

Rise up the ranks

Benn vs. Koivula 
Benn would go on to defend his WBA Continental title multiple times: his first defence came against Finnish veteran Jussi Koivula at York Hall on 21 June 2019. Koivula started strongly in the first round, but Benn was able to catch him with a strong left hook in the second round, sending Koivula to the canvas, and winning by second-round technical knockout shortly afterwards.

Benn vs. Jamoye 
His next fight against Belgian veteran Steve Jamoye on the undercard of Regis Prograis vs. Josh Taylor on 26 October 2019 also resulted in a technical knockout victory for Benn, this time in the fourth round. Benn had a point deducted in the fourth round for a low blow, shortly before he dropped and stopped Jamoye.

Benn vs. Formella 
On 21 November 2020, Benn defeated former IBO welterweight champion Sebastian Formella by unanimous decision at the SSE Arena in Wembley, London. Benn was able to dominate the veteran over the course of 10 rounds.  The three judges scored the bout 99–92, 99–91, and 100–91 for Benn.  It was the second time in his professional career that Benn’s fight went the ten round distance.

Benn vs. Vargas 
Benn returned to the ring on 10 April 2021 to face Samuel Vargas at the Copper Box Arena. Vargas, who had lasted seven rounds with undefeated Vergil Ortiz Jr. in his previous fight, was viewed by many as the toughest test of Benn's career so far. However, the fight lasted just 80 seconds, as Benn landed two right-left combinations which rocked Vargas, followed by a barrage of punches and a hard uppercut on the ropes that saw the bout stopped. In his post-fight interview, a fired-up Benn called out former unified light-welterweight champion Amir Khan, saying "Give me a proper test, give me Amir Khan. He's too busy messing about with reality shows." Khan had previously beaten Vargas by twelve-round unanimous decision in 2018, and was dismissive of the prospect of facing Benn, saying "At his [Benn's] age I was a world champ [sic]. Maybe if he had some belts that fight would make sense but he’s got a long way to go yet".

Benn vs. Granados 
On 14 June 2021, it was announced that Benn had signed a new five-year deal with Matchroom Sport, and that he would be facing Adrián Granados on 31 July as part of Fight Camp in Brentwood, Essex. However, the fight was postponed after Benn tested positive for COVID-19. On 14 August 2021, it was announced that the fight would take place on 4 September at Emerald Headingley Stadium in Leeds on the undercard of Mauricio Lara vs. Josh Warrington II. 

On the night, Benn outworked and outboxed his opponent over the ten-round distance to earn a unanimous decision, with scores of 100–90, 99–91 and 97–93 in his favour. Granados had seemingly been content to just stay in the fight and make no real attempt at winning, and by the final round had become so passive that Benn shouted at him, dropping his hands and banging his legs in an invitation for Granados to stand and fight. Despite the convincing nature of his victory, he expressed annoyance at not stopping his opponent inside the distance, stating in his post-fight interview, "It was very frustrating, he was on his bike the whole fight. I thought he was going to stand toe to toe but I had to hunt him down."

Benn vs. Algieri 
On 7 November 2021, it was announced that Benn would be facing former WBO junior welterweight champion Chris Algieri on 11 December at the M&S Bank Arena in Liverpool.
He beat him inside 4 rounds to retain his title and move to 20-0.

Benn vs. Van Heerden 
On 9 March 2022, It was announced that Benn would face former IBO welterweight champion Chris Van Heerden on 16 April 2022 at the AO Arena in Manchester, England. Benn dominated Van Heerden en route to scoring a second round TKO and retaining his title.

Benn vs Eubank Jr. 
On 5 October 2022, a statement was released from the BBBofC declaring that Chris Eubank Jr. vs Conor Benn is prohibited from taking place on Saturday 8 October after Benn tested positive for clomifene. Benn's promoters released a statement saying, "Benn has not been charged with any rule violation, he is not suspended, and he remains free to fight." Eubank's promoter also said the fight would go ahead as scheduled. The following day, the BBBofC confirmed that the fight had been postponed.

Personal life 
In 2019, Benn portrayed his father Nigel in the fourth instalment of the Rise of the Footsoldier film series.

Similar to his father, Benn is Christian. He has Christian iconography tattooed on his body, and has stated, "I trust in God, I trust in the process."

In addition to his native English, Benn also speaks Spanish due to the time he spent living in Mallorca as a child.

Benn is a supporter of West Ham United F.C.

Professional boxing record

References

External links

Living people
1996 births
Black British sportspeople
English male boxers
English sportspeople of Barbadian descent
Boxers from Greater London
People from Greenwich
Light-welterweight boxers
Welterweight boxers